Hastings South was a federal electoral district represented in the House of Commons of Canada from 1925 to 1968. It was located in the province of Ontario. This riding was created in 1924 from parts of Hastings East and Hastings West ridings.

It consisted of the townships of Hungerford, Tyendinaga, Thurlow and Sydney, and including the city of Belleville and towns of Trenton and Deseronto in the County of Hastings.

The electoral district was abolished in 1966 when it was redistributed between Hastings and Prince Edward—Hastings ridings.

Members of Parliament

This riding elected the following members of the House of Commons of Canada:

Election results

|}

|}

|}

|}

|}

|}

|}

|}

|}

|}

|}

|}

|}

See also 

 List of Canadian federal electoral districts
 Past Canadian electoral districts

External links 
Riding history from the Library of Parliament

Former federal electoral districts of Ontario